The 1986 Washington Huskies football team was an American football team that represented the University of Washington during the 1986 NCAA Division I-A football season.  In its 12th season under head coach Don James, the team compiled an 8–3–1 record, finished in a tie for second place in the Pacific-10 Conference, and outscored its opponents by a combined total of 378 to 197.  Reggie Rogers was selected as the team's most valuable player.  Rogers, Kevin Gogan, Rod Jones, Rick Fenney, Steve Alvord, and Tim Peoples were the team captains.

Schedule

Roster

Rankings

Season summary

at No. 12 USC

Ohio State

BYU

California

Washington State

Jeff Jaeger set NCAA career record for field goals made.

vs. Alabama (Sun Bowl)

NFL Draft
Nine Huskies were selected in the 1987 NFL Draft.

References

Washington
Washington Huskies football seasons
Washington Huskies football